CJOH-DT (channel 13) is a television station in Ottawa, Ontario, Canada, part of the CTV Television Network. It is owned and operated by network parent Bell Media alongside Pembroke-licensed CTV 2 outlet CHRO-TV (channel 5). Both stations share studios with Bell's Ottawa radio properties at the Market Media Mall building on George Street in downtown Ottawa's ByWard Market, while CJOH-DT's transmitter is located on the Ryan Tower at Camp Fortune in Chelsea, Quebec, north of Gatineau.

History 

Founded by Ernie Bushnell, CJOH signed on for the first time on March 12, 1961. Initially, studio facilities were located at 29 Bayswater Avenue until that September when operations were shifted over several weeks to a $2 million complex at 1500 Merivale.

It acquired former Cornwall, Ontario CBC affiliate CJSS-TV as a rebroadcaster in 1963, making CJSS the first television station in Canada to cease operations. The channel 6 transmitter in Deseronto became operational in 1972 to serve the Kingston and Belleville markets. Standard Broadcasting owned the station from 1975 to 1987; that year, after a CRTC decision authorized Baton Broadcasting to launch a new independent station in Ottawa, Standard responded to the potential new competition by selling CJOH to Baton, who then surrendered the new independent licence. Baton was renamed CTV Inc. in 1998 after gaining control of the CTV network the preceding year. CTV in turn would be purchased by Bell Canada and folded into Bell Globemedia, now Bell Media, in 2001.

On August 1, 1995, the station's longtime sports anchor Brian Smith was shot in the station's parking lot by Jeffrey Arenburg, a released mental patient with a history of threatening media personalities, who claimed the station was broadcasting messages inside his head. Smith died in hospital the following day. The incident led to renewed calls across Canada for strengthening of the Canadian government's gun control legislation and provided the impetus for Brian's Law (Ontario Bill 68) – an amendment of the Mental Health Act and Health Care Consent Act which introduced community treatment orders and new criteria for involuntary commitment to psychiatric facilities. Arenburg was released from a mental hospital in Penetanguishene in 2006, then imprisoned for two years for assaulting a U.S. border guard in 2008.

On August 28, 1996, BBS Ontario Incorporated received CRTC approval to add a new analog transmitter on UHF channel 47 at Pembroke, Ontario to rebroadcast programming of CJOH-TV. CHRO-TV was also approved to disaffiliate from the CTV Television Network that same day.

The newsroom was destroyed by a four-alarm fire during the early morning hours of February 7, 2010, destroying equipment and the news archives. The building itself remained intact until it was demolished by the end of December 2011. An adjacent office building housing former sister station CKQB-FM was not affected by the fire.

CJOH's news operations were permanently relocated to CTV's ByWard Market building. This would be the first time the ByWard Market studios would have an evening newscast since the cancellation of sister station CHRO-TV's A News in March 2009.

Programming

Regular local programming

With the exception of networked shows Your Morning (along with its predecessor Canada AM) and Question Period, none of these programs are available in high definition. 
 Regional Contact, with Joel Haslam since 1988 and Kathie Donovan from 1998 to 2012, was the second last local program on CJOH besides standard newscasts. The show was a weekly program that previously aired at 6:30 p.m. on Saturdays, but has been moved to Sunday at the same time beginning in September 2011. Episodes produced during or after 2007 are available as streaming media on CJOH's website. The last episode featuring Donovan aired on May 13, 2012. CJOH has since discontinued Regional Contact as a weekly show, but it remains on the station as a weekly segment during the 6 p.m. newscasts.
 Question Period is a national program about Canadian politics produced in Ottawa since 1967. It is the last non-newscast local program on CJOH since the discontinuation of Regional Contact.

Former local programming

 Bang Bang You're Alive
 Compass
 Vue (where Peter Jennings made his debut)
 Platform
 Dear Charlotte
 Wok with Yan (produced for CBC Television)
 Wayne Rostad Show
 Country Way
 Celebrity Cooks with Bruno Gerussi (produced for  CBC Television, later moved to Global)
 Joys of Collecting
 Uncle Chichimus (originally for CBC Television in 1950s; moved to CJOH in 1960s)
 Saturday Date (1961–1969) was a music and dance show targeted at teenagers, with local performances as well as the top songs on Canadian music charts. Peter Jennings was the host of this show until some time in 1962, when he was replaced by John Pozer. Dick Maloney would replace Pozer in 1964. Although the show ended in 1969, Pozer and Maloney would later return on March 13, 1991 for a Saturday Date reunion along with original participants forming the audience.
 Miss Helen (1960s) was a bilingual show designed for pre-sechoolers. It used the Oogly Woogly worm as one of the actors. This format would later be used by its successor Marie-Soleil.
Strange Paradise (1969–1970; produced for CBC Television)
 The Galloping Gourmet with Graham Kerr (1969–1971; produced for CBC Television)
 The Wonderful World of Kreskin (1970s)
 Mr. Wizard (1971–1972; produced for CBC Television)
 Family Brown Country (1972–1985)
 Morning Magazine (1972–1987; replaced by the national Canada AM) with  Bill Luxton and various co-hosts including Margaret Trudeau
 Marie-Soleil (1980s), although the show's host Suzanne Pinel reappears yearly for the CHEO telethon.
 Homegrown Cafe (1980s–1998) was a talent show hosted by J. J. Clarke, who was CJOH's weatherman for the 6 p.m. weekday news until his retirement in 2020.
 Tech Now (2001–2011) was a local technology journalism news program hosted by Paul Brent. It aired from 6:30 p.m. to about 6:55 p.m. on Sundays, and the last episode aired on July 3, 2011. The program's production has been cancelled after Brent retired, with no new episodes or host, although re-runs of older episodes briefly played after the show was discontinued. Eventually, Tech Now ceased to play on CJOH, and was replaced by Regional Contact which previously played on Saturdays during the same time slot.
Uncle Willy & Floyd (1966–1988) children's comedy with Bill Luxton and Les Lye
You Can't Do That on Television (1979–1990) with Les Lye and Christine McGlade; children's sketch comedy program which was a locally-oriented show that included contests and live segments in its first two seasons before being picked up by Nickelodeon; a short-lived spinoff, Whatever Turns You On, aired nationally in prime time on CTV in the fall of 1979.
Something Else (1982) teen-oriented contest and variety show hosted by Christine McGlade with the cast of You Can't Do That on Television

News operation
CJOH-DT presently broadcasts 20½ hours of locally produced newscasts each week (with 3½ hours each weekday and 1½ hours each on Saturdays and Sundays); in lieu of a local morning newscast (which instead airs on sister station CHRO), CJOH displays local news headlines on a news ticker during its broadcast of CTV's semi-national morning program Your Morning (previously Canada AM).

Local newscasts (under the name CTV News) are aired weekdays at noon, 6 p.m. and 11:30 p.m. The newscasts were previously called Midday Newsline/Newsline/Nightline (depending on the time of day) from the 1970s until 1998, and CJOH News from 1998 to 2005. (In 1982, the 6 p.m. newscast Newsline became, for a brief time, Canada's first 90-minute local supper hour newscast.) From December 10, 2011 to autumn 2012, the noon and 6 p.m. broadcasts broadcast for one hour, though the Sunday evening 6 p.m. broadcast remained a half-hour program. Since April 2012, the audio feed of CJOH's 6 p.m. newscast is simulcast on sister radio station CFRA. The Sunday 6 p.m. newscast expanded to one hour in the fall of 2012.
On July 7, 2014, the station unveiled a new studio to accompany the transition to high definition news production. On August 28, 2017, CJOH launched a new hour of local news content titled CTV News at 5, part of expanded local newscasts announced in June of that year.

Notable current on-air staff
 Graham Richardson – weeknight anchor

Notable former on-air staff
 Arisa Cox – reporter (now host of Big Brother Canada)
 Harry Elton – anchor (1960s) (deceased)
 Peter Jennings – anchor (later at ABC News; deceased)
 Max Keeping – 6 p.m. anchor (deceased)
 Bill Luxton — host of Morning Magazine and various public affairs programmes from 1961 to 1988. (deceased)
 Carol Anne Meehan – weeknight anchor (laid off November 2015)
 Martin Seemungal – reporter
 Brian Smith – sports anchor (deceased)
 Carolyn Waldo – sports anchor; weekends (laid off November 2015)

Technical information

Subchannel

Analogue-to-digital conversion
On August 31, 2011, when Canadian television stations in CRTC-designated mandatory markets transitioned from analogue to digital broadcasts, the station flash cut its digital signal into operation on VHF channel 13. The station's news operations completed upgrades to high definition capabilities, and the first HD news broadcast took place on July 7, 2014, starting with the noon hour newscast.

Spectrum reallocation
As part of the CRTC/FCC spectrum reallocation, CJOH-DT was assigned channel 7 as its new frequency, but instead requested channel 16 (which should have gone to Deseronto) for its new frequency. This was given CRTC approval in March 2020. BellMedia was scheduled to carry out the move to channel 16 around July 3, 2020 marking the end of all VHF TV broadcasting in Ottawa.

Former rebroadcasters
A long list of CTV rebroadcasters nationwide were to shut down on or before August 31, 2009, as part of a political dispute with Canadian authorities on paid fee-for-carriage requirements for cable television operators.

On June 27, 2016, it was announced that Bell Media filed a proposal with the CRTC to shut down 40 of its television transmitters (all rebroadcasters of other stations), due to maintenance costs, high cable and satellite viewership, and no generation of revenue. Among the victims was the former CJSS-TV 8 Cornwall, the first station to rebroadcast CJOH-TV (since 1963).

On July 30, 2019, Bell Media was granted permission to close down CJOH-TV-6 (Deseronto) and CJOH-TV-47 (Pembroke) as part of Broadcasting Decision CRTC 2019-268. CJOH-TV-47 was shut down as of May 2, 2020, and CJOH-TV-6 was shut down on October 9 of the same year.

References

External links 
CTV Ottawa
 

JOH-DT
Television channels and stations established in 1961
JOH-DT
1961 establishments in Ontario